Giulio Caravatta (born March 20, 1966) is a former Canadian football quarterback who currently serves as a Canadian Football League analyst on CKST and Rogers Sportsnet.

A quarterback and punter at Simon Fraser University, Caravatta signed with the BC Lions as an undrafted free agent in 1991. He made his first start on October 21, 1995 against the Baltimore Stallions.  Caravatta was selected by the Montreal Alouettes in a dispersal draft to provide the former Stallions with non-import players, but was traded back to the Lions after he refused to report to his new team. He made one start at quarterback late in the season. It would be Caravatta's last career start at quarterback and until November 8, 2015, the last start for any Canadian-born quarterback in the Canadian Football League until Brandon Bridge started for the Montreal Alouettes. In addition to playing quarterback, Caravatta also saw time as a kicker, punter, and holder.

Caravatta's broadcasting career began in 1999 as an analyst on the Lions' pre- and postgame shows. In 2000 he became the team's colour commentator.

Caravatta is also a member of the West Vancouver Fire and Rescue Unit.

References

1966 births
Living people
Canadian football quarterbacks
Players of Canadian football from Ontario
BC Lions players
Montreal Alouettes players
Canadian Football League announcers
Canadian radio sportscasters
Edmonton Elks players
Simon Fraser Clan football players
Sportspeople from Etobicoke
Canadian football people from Toronto
Canadian sportspeople of Italian descent
Rhein Fire players